Pen Assembly constituency is one of the 288 Vidhan Sabha (legislative assembly) constituencies of Maharashtra state in Western India. It is located in the Raigad district.pen is 30 km from khopoli.khopoli is 13 km away from kalote mokashi.

Members of Legislative Assembly

Election results

General elections 2009

See also
 Pen
 List of constituencies of the Maharashtra Vidhan Sabha

Assembly constituencies of Maharashtra
Politics of Raigad district